G. C. Sekhar is a Telugu, Tamil and Kannada film director. In the 1970s and 1980s, he directed movies featuring prominent actors including Krishnam Raju, Suman, Mohan Babu, Krishna and others.

Filmography

Director
 Jeevana Teeralu in Telugu in 1977
 Allari Bullodu in Telugu in 1978
 Athani Kante Ghanudu in Telugu in 1978
 Adrushtavanthulu in Telugu in 1980
 Aval Oru Pachchaikkuzhandhai in Tamil in 1978
 Vazhkai Alaigal in Tamil in 1978
 Adhrushtavantudu in Telugu in 1980
 Padmavyuham in Telugu in 1984
 Pattudala in Telugu in 1992

Chief Associate Director
 Bhakta Tukaram in Telugu in 1973
 Sansar in Hindi in 1987
 Sathi Sakkubai
 Amma Kosamu
 Bharya

References
http://uk.imdb.com/name/nm1465978/
https://web.archive.org/web/20090325201322/http://www.telugucinema.com/c/publish/starsprofile/MVRaghu.php 
http://www.ragalahari.com/myarticles.asp?article=krishnamrajufilms
http://www.imdb.com/name/nm1465978/bio
https://web.archive.org/web/20080509082034/http://www.mohanbabu.com/Prodused.aspx 
https://web.archive.org/web/20080510194532/http://ccat.sas.upenn.edu/indiancinema/?browse=direction&start=G

Tamil film directors
Living people
Telugu film directors
20th-century Indian film directors
Year of birth missing (living people)